Claude Mobitang Eboa II (born October 19, 1987) is a Cameroonian football player. He currently plays for Namur.

Club career
On July 6, 2011, Mobitang signed an 18-month contract with Algerian club MC Alger. On August 12, 2011, Mobitang made his MC Alger debut as a starter in a 2011 CAF Champions League group stage match against Al-Ahly. Mobitang played the entire match as MC Alger went on to lose 2-0.

References

External links
 
 
 

1987 births
Living people
Algerian Ligue Professionnelle 1 players
Cameroonian footballers
Cameroonian expatriate footballers
Cameroonian expatriate sportspeople in Algeria
Expatriate footballers in Algeria
Expatriate footballers in Belgium
MC Alger players
Union Royale Namur Fosses-La-Ville players
US Changé players
Association football defenders